Kilnafaddoge is a townland in Athlone, County Westmeath, Ireland. The townland is in the civil parish of St. Mary's.

The townland stands in the east area of the town, and the M6 motorway passes to the north. The townland is bordered by Ardnaglug and Collegeland to the west, Cartrontroy and Garrycastle to the east, and Lissywollen to the north.

References 

Townlands of County Westmeath